This is list of churches located in Addis Ababa, Ethiopia.

 Holy Trinity Cathedral
 St. George's Cathedral
 Medhane Alem Cathedral
 Kidus Raguel Church
 Holy International Church
 Yeka Kidane Mehret Church
 Holy Savior Catholic Church
 St Matthew's Anglican Church
 Washa Mikael Rock Hewn Church
 St. George Church (Eastern Orthodox)
 Church of the Nativity of Mary
 Entoto Mariam Church
 CJ Church
 Bethel International Church
 Eastridge Church Addis
 St. Joseph Church
 St. Gabriel Church

References

Churches in Addis Ababa